Jessica Fisher (born March 12, 1976 in Claremont, California) is an American poet, translator, and critic. In 2012, she was awarded the Joseph Brodsky Rome Prize Fellowship in literature by the American Academy of Arts and Letters.

Her first book, Frail-Craft, won the 2006 Yale Series of Younger Poets Competition and was a finalist for the Northern California Book Award. Her second book, Inmost, won the 2011 Nightboat Poetry Prize.

Life
Her poems and translations appear in such journals as The American Poetry Review, At Length, The Believer, the Colorado Review, McSweeney's, The New Yorker, The New York Review of Books, The Paris Review, The Threepenny Review, and TriQuarterly. With Robert Hass, she co-edited The Addison Street Anthology; this book serves as a guide to the Berkeley Poetry Walk, which was named a National Poetry Landmark by the Academy of American Poets.

She holds a B.A. in English and Art History from Swarthmore College and a Ph.D. in English Literature from the University of California at Berkeley, where she was the Holloway Postdoctoral Fellow in Poetry and Poetics from 2009-2011.

She is the daughter of Ann Fisher-Wirth.

Awards

The Joseph Brodsky Rome Prize in Literature, awarded by the American Academy in Arts and Letters, 2012-2013
Nightboat Books Poetry Prize, 2011 
Holloway Postdoctoral Fellowship in Poetry and Poetics, University of California at Berkeley, 2009-2011
Northern California Book Award, finalist, 2008
Yale Younger Poets Prize, 2006
Djerassi Residency Fellowship, 2005
Eisner Award in Poetry, 2000 and 2002

Books

Poetry

Edited

Translations

The Paris Review, "The Swallow's Testicles," a translation of a poem by Hans Arp
The New York Review of Books, "Forget", a translation of a poem by Czeslaw Milosz

Reviews
The New Yorker, Ligaya Mishan
Library Journal
Boston Review, Amelia Klein
Kenyon Review, Meghan O'Rourke
The Missouri Review, Chad Parmenter 
The Rumpus, T Fleischmann

External links
Fisher's page at Nightboat Books

References

Living people
Swarthmore College alumni
University of California, Berkeley alumni
American women poets
1976 births
Yale Younger Poets winners
21st-century American poets
21st-century American translators
21st-century American women writers